Alisa Ozhogina Ozhogin (born 31 October 2000 in Moscow) is a Russian-born Spanish synchro (artistic) swimmer, a two-time 2020 European medalist in team events.

She was born in Moscow, Russia, but grew up in Sevilla.

She represented Spain at the 2021 Olympic Games in Tokyo.

References

External links
 
 
 
 

2000 births
Living people
Swimmers from Moscow
Spanish synchronized swimmers
Olympic synchronized swimmers of Spain
Synchronized swimmers at the 2020 Summer Olympics
World Aquatics Championships medalists in synchronised swimming
Sportspeople from Seville
Russian emigrants to Spain